Mel Bochner (born 1940) is an American conceptual artist. Bochner received his BFA in 1962 and honorary Doctor of Fine Arts in 2005 from the School of Art at Carnegie Mellon University. He lives in New York City.

Life
Bochner was born in Pittsburgh in 1940. In high school, he won early recognition for his talent from The Scholastic Art & Writing Awards and studied with Joseph Fitzpatrick]. He studied art at Carnegie Mellon University and graduated in 1962. After leaving Pittsburgh, he studied philosophy at Northwestern University near Chicago. He moved to New York in 1964 and worked as a guard at The Jewish Museum. In 1966, he was recruited by the influential art critic Dore Ashton to teach art history at the School of Visual Arts in New York.

Bochner is Jewish and his work sometimes explores Jewish themes. Starting in the 1960s, he evolved several of the exhibition strategies now taken for granted, including using the walls of the gallery as the subject of the work and using photo documentation of ephemeral and performance works. As Richard Kalina wrote in Art in America in 1996, Bochner was one of the earliest proponents, along with Joseph Kosuth and Bruce Nauman, of photo-documentation work in which the artist "created not so much a sculpture as a two-dimensional work about sculpture."

His 1966 show at the School of Visual Arts, "Working Drawings And Other Visible Things On Paper Not Necessarily Meant To Be Viewed As Art", is regarded as a seminal show in the conceptual art movement.  Bochner photocopied his friends' working drawings, including a $3,051.16 fabricator's bill from Donald Judd. He collected the copies in four black binders and displayed them on four pedestals. The show was remade at the Drawing Center, New York, in 1998.

Bochner began making paintings in the late 1970s, and his paintings range from extremely colorful works containing words to works more clearly connected to the conceptual art he pioneered. For a 1998 work titled Event Horizon, for example, he arranged prestretched canvases of various sizes along a wall, each marked with a horizontal line and a number denoting its width in inches. Together, the lines appear to form a horizon, creating what Jeffrey Weiss in his catalog essay for Bochner's 2007 exhibit Event Horizon called a representation of "the world as a fantasy of quantifiable truth." Bochner made his first prints at Crown Point Press in the early 1970s, published by Parasol Press.

He taught at Yale University as a teacher's assistant in 1979 as senior critic in painting/printmaking, and in 2001 as adjunct professor.

Exhibitions

In 1985, the Carnegie Mellon Art Gallery organized a major survey titled Mel Bochner:1973-1985. Elaine A. King was the curator of this exhibition and it was accompanied by the publication of a catalog of the same title. This catalogue was given an award by the American Association of Museums. King wrote the essay "Building a Language," and Charles Stuckey contributed the piece "An Interview with Mel Bochner."The exhibition traveled to the Kuntzmuseum in Luzern, Switzerland and Center for Fine Arts, Miami. John Russell wrote in a New York Times article, Art View; The Best and Biggest in Pittsburgh,  New York Times, November 17, 1985

In 1995, Yale University Art Gallery organized a retrospective, Mel Bochner: Thought Made Visible 1966–1973. The exhibit traveled to Brussels and Munich and was accompanied by the publication of a catalog. For his solo show at Sonnabend Gallery in New York in 2000, Bochner layered German and English versions of a text from Wittgenstein. In her review of the show for Art in America, Eleanor Heartney wrote: 

In 2004, Bochner's work was exhibited in the Whitney Biennial and was part of OpenSystems: Rethinking Art c. 1970 at London's Tate Modern in 2005. His pieces are held in several major museum collections, including the Museum of Modern Art in New York.

In 2011, a retrospective of his work was held at the National Gallery of Art in Washington D.C.

A survey of Mel Bochner's work - entitled Mel Bochner: If the Colour Changes, was held at Whitechapel Gallery, London, Haus der Kunst, Munich and Museu de Arte Contemporânea de Serralves, Porto during 2012. Tracing nearly 50 years of work, this exhibition commences with Blah, Blah, Blah (2011) a huge painting that encapsulates Bochner's ongoing fascination with language and with colour.  The exhibition is accompanied by a first comprehensive monograph, published by Ridinghouse, with essays by Achim Borchardt-Hume, Briony Fer, João Fernandes, Mark Godfrey and Ulrich Wilmes.

Artists books and multiples
• Singer Notes, 1968, 132 pages, 25.8 x 20.5 x 1.4 cm. Limited edition of 200 numbered and signed copies and 50 artist's proofs. Produced and published in 2017 by mfc-michèle didier.

• Measurement Perimeter, Black adhesive tape (thickness 1.3 cm) placed on the wall (heigh 1.80 m). The total dimension of the room is indicated on the wall in Letraset (thickness about 6.5 cm). Dimensions depending on the size of the room. Limited edition of 3 numbered and signed copies. Produced in 2017 by mfc-michèle didier.

• From the seminal canvas in 2008 until 2012 Bochner executed a painting series titled BLAH! BLAH! BLAH! after the motif of the textual content of the works.

See also
 Kraus Campo

References

External links
Mel Bochner at Artcyclopedia

 Peter Freeman Gallery representing Mel Bochner in 2007
 The Medium and the Tedium Bochner's account of conceptual art and its mediums in Triple Canopy (online magazine)
 Mel Bochner at The Jewish Museum

20th-century American Jews
American conceptual artists
American printmakers
Carnegie Mellon University College of Fine Arts alumni
Artists from New York (state)
Artists from Connecticut
Artists from Pittsburgh
1940 births
Jewish American artists
Living people
21st-century American Jews